Kemet, kmt or km.t may refer to:
 Kemet or km.t, an ancient name of Egypt meaning "black lands"
 KEMET Corporation, American capacitor manufacturer
 Kemetism, revivals of the ancient Egyptian religion
 Kmt (magazine), an academic journal of ancient Egypt
 A fictional compound for protecting against dragon fire, in the 1984 book The Hero and the Crown by Robin McKinley
 Sons of Kemet, a British jazz group formed in 2011

See also
 Km (hieroglyph)